Jorge Barbosa may refer to:

 Jorge Barbosa (writer) (1901–1971), Cape Verdean writer and poet
 Jorge Barbosa (footballer) (born 1979), Brazilian football forward